Bryan Joel Rodriguez (born September 9, 1997) is an American professional soccer player who plays as a midfielder for Tomori.

Career
Joel Rodriguez started his career with Polish fifth division side Odra Wodzisław.

In 2020, he signed for Laçi in the Albanian top flight. On November 1, 2020, he debuted for Laçi during a 3–0 win over Vora.

Before the second half of the 2020–21 season, he was sent on loan to Albanian second division club Tomori.

Career statistics

References

External links
 
 Bryan Joel Rodriguez at playmakerstats.com

Living people
1997 births
American people of Mexican descent
American soccer players
Association football midfielders
Kategoria Superiore players
Kategoria e Parë players
Odra Wodzisław Śląski players
KF Laçi players
KF Tomori players
American expatriate soccer players
American expatriate sportspeople in Poland
Expatriate footballers in Poland
American expatriate sportspeople in Albania
Expatriate footballers in Albania